Winchelsea railway station is a railway station in East Sussex, England. The station originally had two platforms, but in 1979, the line was singled and only the up platform is now in use. The former down platform and station building are now converted to a private house.

Location

The station is in an isolated location. It is not a convenient way of getting to or from Winchelsea, especially outside daylight hours. The route from the station to the town involves walking down an unlit and winding country lane, then walking along the A259 trunk road before climbing a steep hill to reach the town. The journey takes about 20 minutes on foot. However, local people may book a free lift to and from the station via a voluntary scheme run through Winchelsea Farm Kitchen. 

As an alternative to trains, Stagecoach runs bus route 100 between Hastings and Rye, which stops in the town.

Despite its isolation and limited stopping service, the station is used by walkers visiting the Brede Valley.

Facilities
The buildings have been sold into private ownership and so this station is unstaffed. There is a ticket machine at the station.

Free parking facilities are available at the station.

History
The station, like several others on the line, was built with staggered platforms on the belief that it would be safer for passengers to cross the railway behind a departing train.

Traffic was very sparse and the station closed on 1 September, in part because it was impossible to access the town without crossing private land. The Mayor of Winchelsea campaigned for reopening and negotiating access with the respective landowner, and the SER agreed to open the station on 4 December. A resignalling programme took place in the early 1890s.

The station gradually reduced its facilities. In 1961, the station building was sold off, and has since been in private hands. By 1969, the signal box and goods siding had been removed, and by the early 1970s the shelter canopy was removed and the post of crossing keeper was discontinued. On 1 October 1979, the line was reduced to single track to reduce operational costs. The down platform (to Hastings) was removed; since then all trains have stopped at the one remaining platform. A  speed limit was imposed on the line approaching Winchelsea. The wooden shelter on the remaining (up) platform was replaced by a conventional modern shelter in 1984.

Local campaign groups Three Oaks and Winchelsea Action for Rail Transport (THWART) and the Marshlink Action Group (MLAG) campaigned for services to be increased, and from December 2010 a two-hourly service in each direction was restored. In 2015, trains began stopping at the station on Sundays, after a ten-year campaign.

Services
All services at Winchelsea are operated by Southern using  DMUs.

Previously, westbound trains ran as an express service to  although this was changed to a stopping service to Eastbourne in the May 2018 timetable change.

References

Citations

Sources

External links

 Photos of Winchelsea station

Railway stations in East Sussex
DfT Category F2 stations
Former South Eastern Railway (UK) stations
Railway stations in Great Britain opened in 1851
Railway stations served by Govia Thameslink Railway
1851 establishments in England
Rother District